The Municipality of Kungota is a municipality in the western part of the Slovene Hills in northeastern Slovenia. Its seat is the village of Zgornja Kungota.

Settlements
In addition to the municipal seat of Zgornja Kungota, the municipality also includes the following settlements:

 Ciringa
 Gradiška
 Grušena
 Jedlovnik
 Jurski Vrh
 Kozjak nad Pesnico
 Pesnica
 Plač
 Plintovec
 Podigrac
 Rošpoh
 Slatina
 Slatinski Dol
 Špičnik
 Spodnje Vrtiče
 Svečina
 Vršnik
 Zgornje Vrtiče

References

External links

Municipality of Kungota on Geopedia

Kungota